Anthony T. Lucas (often A.T. Lucas) (1911 – 26 March 1986) was an Irish archaeologist, historian and museologist who served as president of the Royal Society of Antiquaries of Ireland from 1969 to 1973, and as director of the National Museum of Ireland (NMI) from 1954 to 1976.

Lucas was born in 1911 to an Austrian father and Irish mother, and lived for most of his life in Dublin. He studied at University College Dublin where he received a BA and MA. During his career, Lucas wrote extensively on topics ranging from bog-wood, Insular metalwork, church history, and early medieval folk-life topics such as agricultural techniques such as trapping, snaring and ploughing, food (including pre-potato Irish diets) and clothes.

In the early 1960s, he collaborated with Séamus Ó Duilearga, the chair of the Irish Folklore Commission, to create and circulate a questionnaire on the uses of hay, rushes, and straw. It was sent to 150 people, and from the results, Lucas embarked on an extensive collecting programme in the NMI for objects made of these materials.

He was closely invloved with the Irish Folklore Commission, and in 1976 a bibliography of his published works was compiled by archaeologist Etienne Rynne (1932–2012) in Folk & Farm: Essays in Honour of A. T. Lucas.

Monographs and articles
The following list is incomplete:
 "The Social Role of Relics and Reliquaries in Ancient Ireland". The Journal of the Royal Society of Antiquaries of Ireland, volume 116 (1986). 
 "The plundering and burning of churches in Ireland, 7th to 16th century". North Munster Studies, (1967)
 "Bog Wood: A Study in Rural Economy". Bealoideas, 23 (1954)
 "Furze." Stationery Office for the National Museum of Ireland. (1960)

References

Sources
 Almqvist, Bo; Delaney, James. "Dr. A. T. Lucas (1911–86)". Folklore of Ireland Society, 1987. 

Irish archaeologists
Alumni of University College Dublin
1911 births
1986 deaths